The Last of the Unjust (original French title:Le Dernier des injustes) is a 2013 French documentary film directed by Claude Lanzmann that centres on the activities of Rabbi Benjamin Murmelstein in the Theresienstadt concentration camp, during The Holocaust.

References

2. Hájková, Anna, The Last of the Self-Righteous: Claude Lanzmann’s version of Benjamin Murmelstein,histoire@politique, September 2014

3. Yvonne Kozlovsky Golan (2017),  "Benjamin Murmelstein, a Man from the "Town 'As If'": A Discussion of Claude Lanzmann's Film the Last of the Unjust (France/Austria, 2013)", Holocaust Studies, A Journal of Culture and History, vol. 23, No. 4, pp. 464–482. 

4. Yvonne Kozlovsky Golan (2019), "The Role of the Judenräte in Serving Nazi Racial Policy: a Discussion of Claude Lanzmann’s film ‘Last of the unjust’", Slil: a Journal of History, Cinema and Television, pp. 72-98, peer-reviewed (Heb.). 

5. Yvonne Kozlovsky Golan (2020), "Through the Director’s Lens: Claude Lanzmann’s Oeuvre: Commemorating the First Anniversary of his Passing", 
Canadian Institute for the Study of Antisemitism (CISA), Antisemitism Studies, Vol. 4, No. 1 (Spring 2020), pp. 143-168.

External links
 

2013 films
2013 documentary films
French documentary films
Documentary films about the Holocaust
Films directed by Claude Lanzmann
Theresienstadt Ghetto
2010s French films